Fight Club was a martial arts TV magazine program, created by Samuel Pagal and broadcast by the French based, pan-European broadcasting sports channel Eurosport. The program includes various events, bouts and special features of kickboxing throughout the world.

Fight Club was aired on 21:00 CET on Thursdays. The replays were generally scheduled in weekends in shortened versions.

Content
The Fight Club program was notable for airing K-1 events. Its whole calendar was usually shown over the course of the year. The K-1 martial arts organization had tournaments in K-1 MAX for a 70.5 kg (155 lb) weight division, and in K-1 World Grand Prix for the +90 kg (200 lb) weight division. In addition, fight club often covered various kickboxing and Muay Thai events from Europe, within modified rules in European standards.

Featured events

Top 10 KOs
The program also supplies special features like exclusive interviews with fighters and a popular Top 10 KOs list, which encloses the most spectacular knock outs made that year.

Commentators
Eurosport broadcasts in 20 different languages all around Europe and in English in Asia-Pacific Zone. The commentators for each language are below:

Technical support
The program was edited in Eurosport Central Building studios which is located in Issy-Les-Moulineaux commune, Paris by Samuel Pagal, Annie Vicaire and Charle-Henri Odin, the editors of the show.

See also

Eurosport
Sports channel

References

External links
 Portal site
 Corporate information site

Eurosport
Martial arts magazines
French sports television series
Kickboxing television series
Mixed martial arts television shows